Pozhar is a rural locality (a village) in Tiginskoye Rural Settlement, Vozhegodsky District, Vologda Oblast, Russia. The population was 16 as of 2002.

Geography 
Pozhar is located 21 km west of Vozhega (the district's administrative centre) by road. Petrovka is the nearest rural locality.

References 

Rural localities in Vozhegodsky District